The office of Mayor of the City and County of Limerick is currently the title used by the chairperson of Limerick City and County Council. Prior to the establishment of the council, the Mayor of Limerick was the chairperson of Limerick City Council. The office was originally established in 1195 and reinforced by a charter issued in 1197.

Election to the office
The Mayor is elected to office annually by councillors of Limerick City and County Council from amongst its members. There is currently no popular vote, but in May 2019 a plebiscite was held during the local elections which voted in favour of a directly elected mayor, with the first expected to be elected in 2022. Current practice is for the term of office to begin in June with the former Mayor presenting the Chain of Office to the incoming Mayor, thus formally inaugurating a new term.  The process is repeated the following June, unless the same person is given a second consecutive term.

History of the office
The office has existed, in one form or another, since it was inaugurated in 1195. The title of Provost was used up to the 14th century.

Selected list of mayors

 Thomas Smyth (1764–1765, 1776–1777), MP and Colonel of Limerick Militia
 John Vereker, 3rd Viscount Gort (1831–1832), MP and later Irish Peer
 Stephen O'Mara (1885–1887), nationalist MP and later Cummann na nGael Senator, first nationalist Mayor of Limerick
 John Daly (1899–1901), revolutionary nationalist MP, leading member of Irish Republican Brotherhood involved in 1867 rising
 Michael Joyce (1905–1907), nationalist MP, leader of Irish National League, founder of Garryowen Football Club
 Phons O'Mara (1918–1920), republican, negotiated truce with Limerick Soviet in 1919
 George Clancy (1921), Sinn Féin Mayor shot dead in office by Black and Tans in 1921
 Stephen M. O'Mara (1921–1923), republican politician, later Fianna Fail member of the Council of State
 Michael Keyes (1928–1930), Labour Party TD, Minister for Local Government and Posts and Telegraphs and President of the Irish Trades Union Congress, the first Limerick person to be a cabinet member since independence
 Stephen Coughlan (1951–1952, 1969–1970), Labour Party TD
 Ted Russell (1954–1957, 1967–1968, 1976–1977), Independent and later Fine Gael politician, TD and Senator,
 Donogh O'Malley (1961–1962), Fianna Fail Minister for Education and Health, introduced free secondary education up to Intermediate Certificate
 Frances Condell (1962–1964), first elected woman Mayor
 Michael Lipper (1973–1974), Democratic Labour and Labour Party TD 
  Pat Kennedy (1974–1975), Fine Gael Senator
 Thady Coughlan (1975–1976), Labour Party, aged 24, youngest Mayor since 1842
 Frank Prendergast (1977–1978, 1984–1985), Labour Party TD
 Tony Bromell (1982–1983), Fianna Fail Senator
 Jim Kemmy (1991–1992, 1995–1996), Labour Party TD
 Jan O'Sullivan (1993–1994), later Labour Party Senator, TD, Minister for Education and Skills
 Kevin Kiely (2009–2010), Fine Gael councillor

See also
Lord Mayor of Dublin
Lord Mayor of Cork
Mayor of Galway

References

 
Lists of political office-holders in the Republic of Ireland
1195 establishments in Europe
Mayors